The Kentucky Circuit Courts are the state courts of general jurisdiction in the U.S. state of Kentucky.

Jurisdiction and bench
The Circuit Courts are trial courts with original jurisdiction in cases involving capital offenses and other felonies;  land disputes; contested probates of wills; and civil lawsuits in disputes with an amount in controversy over $5,000. Circuit courts also have the power to issue injunctions, writs of prohibition, writs of mandamus, and appeals from the decisions of administrative agencies.

Circuit Courts also hear appeals from the District Courts, which in Kentucky are courts of limited jurisdiction that hear misdemeanor criminal cases, traffic violations, violations of county and municipal ordinances and small claims.

The family court division of Circuit Court has original jurisdiction in cases involving dissolution of marriage (divorce), child custody, visitation, maintenance and support (alimony and child support), equitable distribution of property in dissolution cases; adoption, and termination of parental rights. The family court division has concurrent jurisdiction with the District Court over proceedings involving domestic violence and abuse, the Uniform Parentage Act and Uniform Interstate Family Support Act, dependency, child abuse and neglect, and juvenile status offenses.

Circuit judges serve in eight-year terms. There are 57 circuits, which may have one or more judges, depending on the population and docket size. Circuits may include one or more counties; some have up to four. The Jefferson County Circuit Court is the largest single unified trial court in Kentucky.

Appeals from decisions of the Circuit Courts are made to the Kentucky Court of Appeals, the state intermediate appellate court, which may be further appealed to the Kentucky Supreme Court. (Criminal cases in which a defendant has been sentenced to death, life imprisonment, or imprisonment of 20 years or more are taken directly to the  Kentucky Supreme Court.)

Circuits

First Circuit – Hickman, Fulton, Carlisle, Ballard
Second Circuit – McCracken
Third Circuit – Christian 
Fourth Circuit – Hopkins 
Fifth Circuit – Crittenden, Webster, Union
Sixth Circuit – Daviess
Seventh Circuit – Logan, Todd
Eighth Circuit – Warren
Ninth Circuit – Hardin
Tenth Circuit –  Nelson, LaRue, Hart
Eleventh Circuit – Taylor, Green, Marion, Washington
Twelfth Circuit – Oldham, Henry, Trimble
Thirteenth Circuit – Jessamine, Garrard
Fourteenth Circuit – Bourbon, Scott, Woodford
Fifteenth Circuit – Carroll, Owen, Grant
Sixteenth Circuit – Kenton
Seventeenth Circuit – Campbell
Eighteenth Circuit – Pendleton, Harrison, Nicholas, Robertson
Nineteenth Circuit – Bracken, Fleming, Mason
Twentieth Circuit – Lewis, Greenup
Twenty-first Circuit – Bath, Menifee, Montgomery, Rowan
Twenty-second Circuit – Fayette
Twenty-third Circuit – Estill, Lee, Owsley
Twenty-fourth Circuit – Martin, Lawrence, Johnson
Twenty-fifth Circuit – Clark, Madison
Twenty-sixth Circuit – Harlan
Twenty-seventh Circuit – Knox, Laurel
Twenty-eighth Circuit – Lincoln, Rockcastle, Pulaski
Twenty-ninth Circuit – Adair, Casey
Thirtieth Circuit – Jefferson - Jefferson County Circuit Court
Thirty-first Circuit – Floyd
Thirty-second Circuit – Boyd
Thirty-third Circuit – Perry
Thirty-fourth Circuit – McCreary, Whitley
Thirty-fifth Circuit – Pike
Thirty-sixth Circuit – Magoffin, Knott
Thirty-seventh Circuit – Carter, Elliott, Morgan
Thirty-eighth Circuit – Butler, Edmonson, Hancock, Ohio
Thirty-ninth Circuit – Breathitt, Powell, Wolfe
Fortieth Circuit – Clinton, Cumberland, Monroe
Forty-first Circuit – Clay, Jackson, Leslie
Forty-second Circuit – Calloway, Marshall
Forty-third Circuit – Barren, Metcalfe
Forty-fourth Circuit – Bell
Forty-fifth Circuit – McLean, Muhlenberg 
Forty-sixth Circuit – Breckinridge, Grayson, Meade
Forty-seventh Circuit – Letcher
Forty-eighth Circuit – Franklin
Forty-ninth Circuit – Allen, Simpson
Fiftieth Circuit – Boyle, Mercer
Fifty-first Circuit – Henderson
Fifty-second Circuit – Graves
Fifty-third Circuit – Anderson, Shelby, Spencer
Fifty-fourth Circuit – Boone, Gallatin
Fifty-fifth Circuit – Bullitt
Fifty-sixth Circuit – Caldwell, Livingston, Lyon, Trigg
Fifty-seventh Circuit – Russell, Wayne

References

External links
Circuit Courts from the Kentucky judiciary website

Kentucky state courts
Kentucky
Courts and tribunals with year of establishment missing